Esther M. Broner, best known as E.M. Broner, (Masserman; July 8, 1927 – June 21, 2011) was a Jewish American feminist author.

Personal life 
Broner attended Wayne State University and received a bachelor's degree in sociology and a master's degree in creative writing. She received her PhD in religion at what is now the Union Institute & University. Broner returned to Wayne State to teach English and also taught at Sarah Lawrence College.

She was married to Robert Broner, a printmaker and painter, and they had four children together.

Career 
In 1976, Broner's first women-only Passover seder was held in her New York City apartment. It was led by her, with 13 women attending, including Gloria Steinem, Letty Cottin Pogrebin, and Phyllis Chesler. Broner and Naomi Nimrod created a women's haggadah for use at this seder. In the spring of 1976 Broner published this “Women’s Haggadah” in Ms. magazine, later publishing it as a book in 1994; this haggadah is meant to include women where only men had been mentioned in traditional haggadahs, and it features the Wise Women, the Four Daughters, the Women's Questions, the Women's Plagues, and a women-centric “Dayenu”. A Women's Seder has been held with the Women's Haggadah every year since 1976, and women-only seders are now held by some congregations as well. Broner led her Women's Seder for 30 years.

Her papers are held at Brandeis University.

Works 

 
 "Body memories" and "Sitting Shiva for a lost love" in 
 
 
 

Broner had also written radio scripts for National Public Radio and plays. Her musical, “Higginson: An American Life,” premiered June 17, 2005, by the Michigan Opera Theatre (Broner, book & lyrics; Mort Zieve, music).

References

External links
E.M. Broner collection at Brandeis University

1927 births
2011 deaths
American feminist writers
Jewish women writers
Jewish feminists
20th-century American women writers
Women religious writers
Wayne State University alumni
Union Institute & University alumni